Dr. Antal Gábor Hollósi (born August 1946) is a Hungarian physician and politician, member of the National Assembly (MP) for Újpest (Budapest Constituency V) between 2010 and 2014. He was defeated by Péter Kiss in the 2014 parliamentary election, and by Imre Horváth during the 2015 by-election in Újpest.

Hollósi was a member of the Committee on Health from May 14, 2010 to May 5, 2014.

References

1946 births
Living people
Physicians from Budapest
Fidesz politicians
Members of the National Assembly of Hungary (2010–2014)
Politicians from Budapest